This list is of prehistoric mammals known from the fossil record of the Japanese archipelago. For extant mammals from the area, see List of mammals of Japan (which includes the recently extinct species on the IUCN Red List and its domestic counterpart the Ministry of the Environment Red List). Other species that have gone extinct in historic times and extant species that have been locally extirpated and no longer form part of the fauna of Japan but are known from the fossil or subfossil record are additionally listed at the bottom of this page.

Mesozoic

Cenozoic

Historical extinctions and local extirpations

Fossil species synonymized with extant or recently extinct species

See also

 List of prehistoric birds of Japan
 Land bridges of Japan

References

Mammals of Japan
Fossils of Japan
Prehistoric mammals of Asia
mammals
Japan